Don Juan ou Le Festin de Pierre (Don Juan, or the Stone Guest's Banquet) is a ballet with a libretto by Ranieri de' Calzabigi, music by Christoph Willibald von Gluck, and choreography by Gasparo Angiolini.  The ballet's first performance was in Vienna, Austria on Saturday, 17 October 1761, at the Theater am Kärntnertor. Its innovation in the history of ballet, coming a year before Gluck's radical reform of opera seria with his Orfeo ed Euridice (1762), was its coherent narrative element, though the series of conventional divertissement dances in the second act lies within the well-established ballet tradition of an entr'acte effecting a pause in the story-telling. The ballet follows the legend of Don Juan and his descent into Hell after killing his inamorata's father in a duel.

Background
The ballet Don Juan was based on Molière's Dom Juan ou le Festin de pierre of 1665.

The 19th movement marked "Moderato" was used by Mozart in the third act finale of his opera Le nozze di Figaro.

References

Footnotes

Bibliography

External links
 Original edition of the libretto in Bayerischen Staatsbibliotek

Ballets by Gasparo Angiolini
Ballets by Ranieri de' Calzabigi
Ballets by Christoph Willibald Gluck
1761 ballet premieres
Works based on the Don Juan legend